Maciej Polody (born 30 September 1976) is a drifting driver from Poznań, Poland. He now competes in the European Drift Championship, the successor to the D1GB.

External links
DRIFTING.pl - Polish official drifting site (in English too)
PolodyPerformance (in English too)
PFD - Polish Federation of Drift (Polska Federacja Driftingu) created by Maciej Polody in 2005

1976 births
Polish racing drivers
D1 Grand Prix drivers
Drifting drivers
Living people
Sportspeople from Poznań